Evernight may refer to:

 Evernight (album), an album by the Finnish heavy metal band Battlelore
 Evernight (novel), a young adult novel by Claudia Gray
 Evernight (series), a series of novels by Claudia Gray
 Evernight Games, a video game developer